Soure is a town and municipality of the Coimbra District, in Portugal. The population in 2011 was 19,245, in an area of 265.06 km². It includes a castle listed as a national monument.

Parishes
Administratively, the municipality is divided into 10 civil parishes (freguesias):
 Alfarelos
 Degracias e Pombalinho
 Figueiró do Campo
 Gesteira e Brunhós
 Granja do Ulmeiro
 Samuel
 Soure
 Tapeus
 Vila Nova de Anços
 Vinha da Rainha

Climate

References

External links
Photos from Soure

 
Towns in Portugal
Municipalities of Coimbra District